The 1943 Consett by-election was a parliamentary by-election held for the British House of Commons constituency of Consett on 15 November 1943.

The seat had become vacant when the Labour Member of Parliament David Adams had died on 16 August 1943, aged 72. He had held the seat since the 1935 general election.

During World War II, the parties in the war-time coalition government had agreed not contest by-elections where a seat held by any of their parties fell vacant, so the Labour candidate, James Glanville  was returned unopposed. He represented the constituency until he retired from the House of Commons at the 1955 general election.

See also
Consett
List of United Kingdom by-elections (1931–1950)

References

1943 elections in the United Kingdom
1943 in England
Unopposed by-elections to the Parliament of the United Kingdom (need citation)
Consett
20th century in County Durham
Consett